The European Mountain Running Championships is an annual international mountain running race. Inaugurated in 2002, it is organised by the European Athletic Association (EAA) in July each year. The venue for the championships is changed each year.

The history of the competition lies in the European Mountain Running Trophy, which was first held in 1994 in Quantin, Belluno, Italy. It was officially sanctioned by the World Mountain Running Association in 1995 and continued until 2001, at which point the EAA introduced the official European Mountain Running Championships.

Exclusively a senior championships until 2009, the competition now features separate senior and junior (under 20s) races for both men and women. Medals are awarded on an individual and national team basis. For the team competition, the finishing positions of each country's top three runners are combined, and the team with the smallest cumulative total wins the medals.

Editions

Medals
All results at European Athletic Association web site.

Men

Women

See also
World Mountain Running Championships
World Long Distance Mountain Running Challenge
NACAC Mountain Running Championships
South American Mountain Running Championships
Commonwealth Mountain and Ultradistance Running Championships

References

List of champions
EA European Trophy (1995-2001)/European Championships (2002 on): Results . World Mountain Running Association. Retrieved on 2015-02-04.

External links
  at WMRA
Official website at European Athletics
All medalists from 1994 to 2017 at Association of Road Racing Statisticians

 
Mountain
Recurring sporting events established in 1994
Continental athletics championships